The Rose Family is a Canadian documentary film, directed by Félix Rose and released in 2020. The film centres on the filmmaker's status as the son of Paul Rose, a onetime leader of the Front de libération du Québec who was convicted of kidnapping and murder in the death of Pierre Laporte, and his efforts to come to terms with his complicated familial legacy.

The film was criticized by Lise Ravary of the Montreal Gazette for purportedly romanticizing the FLQ; although Félix Rose denied this, and stated that "the idea was not to minimize what they did, on the contrary, it was to put it in context, to allow us to understand what led to it."

Awards
The film won the Public Prize at the 23rd Quebec Cinema Awards in 2021.

It was shortlisted for the Prix collégial du cinéma québécois in 2021.

References

External links

2020 films
2020 documentary films
Canadian documentary films
Front de libération du Québec
Quebec films
Documentary films about Quebec politics
Films shot in Quebec
National Film Board of Canada documentaries
2020s French-language films
French-language Canadian films
2020s Canadian films